Iain Flannigan (born 15 January 1988) is a former Scottish professional footballer.

Flannigan previously played for Kilmarnock and then went on to play for
Partick Thistle, Greenock Morton and Falkirk, before a lengthy stint with Alloa Athletic.

Career
Flannigan started his career at Kilmarnock and debuted on 25 September 2007, as a first-half substitute in a 2–0 defeat to Hamilton Academical in the third round of the Scottish League Cup. On 6 October 2007, Flannigan's Scottish Premier League debut was as a 19 year old in a 2–2 draw versus Inverness Caledonian Thistle.

On 22 March 2008, Flannigan scored his first goal for the club in a 4–1 home victory versus Inverness Caledonian Thistle. He was influential in Killie's equaliser by hitting the post with a free kick before the rebound was scored by team-mate Frazer Wright and he then scored the fourth goal of the match when a low cross was perfectly met by him after a surging run into the penalty box.

On 28 July 2010, after being on trial for a few weeks, Flannigan signed for Partick Thistle. On 31 January 2012, he departed the club.

In March 2012, Flannigan went on trial with Greenock Morton and debuted in a draw versus Ross County. He signed until the end of the season towards the end of March 2012. During this period Flannigan sustained an elbow injury that required surgery and he departed the club at the end of his contract.

On 20 November 2012, Flannigan then went on trial at Falkirk and played in an under 20's match versus Hibernian. On 22 February 2013, following his successful trial, Flannigan signed for the Bairns. On 7 May 2013, after only three appearances, he departed the club, along with another four players.

On 5 July 2013, Flannigan signed for Scottish Championship club Alloa Athletic.

On 20 June 2020, Alloa announced on their website that Flannigan had retired from playing football.

Career statistics

References

External links

1988 births
Living people
Scottish footballers
Kilmarnock F.C. players
Scottish Premier League players
Partick Thistle F.C. players
Scottish Football League players
Greenock Morton F.C. players
Association football midfielders
Footballers from Glasgow
Falkirk F.C. players
Alloa Athletic F.C. players
Scottish Professional Football League players